Iola Leroy, or Shadows Uplifted, an 1892 novel by Frances E. W. Harper, is one of the first novels published by an African-American woman. While following what has been termed the "sentimental" conventions of late nineteenth-century writing about women, it also deals with serious social issues of education for women, passing, miscegenation, abolition, reconstruction, temperance, and social responsibility.

Characters

Iola Leroy and family
Iola Leroy, the principal character of the novel.

Harriet Johnson, Iola Leroy's grandmother. While a slave of Nancy Johnson, she resists a whipping. As a punishment, she is sold.

Robert Johnson. He is still a child when separated from his mother Harriet. His enslaver, Nancy Johnson, sees him as a "pet animal" and teaches him to read. As a young man, he becomes the leader of a group of slaves who decide to seek refuge with the Union army during the Civil War. He enlists in a colored regiment and is promoted to lieutenant. On account of his white skin, his superiors council him to change to a white regiment for better chances of promotion, but he refuses. After the war, he successfully runs a hardware store.

Marie Leroy, Iola's mother. A small child when brutally separated from her mother Harriet Johnson, she finally becomes the slave of wealthy Eugene Leroy. When Eugene becomes seriously ill, she nurses him back to health. He sets her free, has her educated and marries her in a secret ceremony. Although she is so white that "no one would suspect that she has one drop of negro blood in her veins", the marriage results in the Leroy family becoming social outcasts.

Harry Leroy, Iola's brother. Like Iola, he is educated in the North. The African ancestry of their mother is concealed from the children, and they are not allowed to pass their vacations at home, spending that time instead together with the parents in a northern holiday resort. When he learns that his father has died and his mother and sister are enslaved, he becomes seriously ill from the shock. When he recovers, the Civil War has begun and he decides to enlist in a colored regiment, making the recruiting officer wonder why a white man should want to do that.

Dr. Frank Latimer, the man who Iola finally marries. He was born into slavery as the son of an enslaved mother of predominantly European ancestry and a white man. After emancipation, his mother invested her hard earnings to pay for his studies. He graduated as a medical doctor and afterwards met his white grandmother, the rich mother of his deceased father, who offered to "adopt him as her heir, if he would ignore his identity with the colored race". Although no trace of his African ancestry was visible in his appearance, he declined the offer.

Lucille Delany, a black woman with apparently no European ancestry, the founder of a school for "future wives and mothers", and the woman who Harry finally marries.

Other black characters
Tom Anderson, friend of Robert Johnson. He seeks refuge with the Union army together with Johnson, causes the commander to set Iola free, joins the army and dies in Iola's care from wounds he received while knowingly sacrificing himself in order to save his comrades.

Aunt Linda, enslaved cook of Nancy Johnson who has a special liking for Robert. She is illiterate and speaks in black dialect, yet she is among the black female characters of the novel who are intelligent, loyal to each other and of central importance to their community.

Uncle Daniel, elder friend of Robert Johnson. When Robert and his group seek refuge with the Union army, he stays behind because he doesn't want to break his promise to his absent master.

White characters
Dr. Gresham, military physician. He falls in love with Iola while he still thinks that she is white. When informed that she is "colored", his love helps him to overcome his prejudice, and he proposes to Iola at two different points of the story. When rejected for the second time, "sympathy, love, and admiration were blended in the parting look he gave her".

Dr. Latrobe, physician from the South. He is mentioned only in chapters 26, Open Questions, and 28, Dr. Latrobe's Mistake. In a discussion, he voices the view of southern white supremacists.

Plot summary

In a North Carolina town which is only identified as "C—", a group of slaves led by Robert Johnson seek refuge with the Union army that is approaching in the course of the Civil War. Robert's friend Tom Anderson then informs the Union commander of a beautiful young woman held as a slave in the neighborhood, who is subsequently set free by the commander.

In a retrospective, the narrative turns to the story of that woman, Iola Leroy. Her father, Eugene Leroy, was a wealthy slaveholder, who had survived a serious illness through the care of a young slave, Marie. He set Marie free, married her and had three children, whose African ancestry was not visible in their outward appearance. The elder children, Iola and Harry, were educated in the North and their African ancestry (called "negro blood" in the book) was hidden from them. When Eugene suddenly died of yellow fever, his cousin, Alfred Lorraine, had a judge declare Marie's manumission void. Hence, Marie and her children were legally considered slaves and the heritage fell to Lorraine and other distant relatives. Lorraine sent his agent to the northern seminary where Iola was preparing for her graduation and defending the institution of slavery in discussions with her fellow students. Deceitfully being told that her father was dying, Iola followed the agent to her home, where she learned that she was a slave and was sold away from her mother.

The narrative then returns to the events following Iola's rescue by the Union army: Robert Johnson and Tom Anderson join the army "to strike a blow for freedom", while Iola becomes a nurse in a military hospital. When Robert is entrusted to her care after being wounded, they tell each other their stories which suggest that Robert might be the brother of Iola's mother--her uncle. After the war, they return to "C—" to search for Robert's mother, who they recognize when she tells her story during a prayer meeting.

The family is reunited when they locate Harry who had been fighting in the Union army in a Black regiment, and met with his and Iola's mother during the war.

Themes
Much space is given to discussions in which the characters talk about themes such as temperance, religion, the position of women in society, alleged white superiority, racism and lynchings, and the color line.

Temperance: The damaging effects of alcohol are often discussed in the book. For example, after the war the black characters tell each other of two former masters who took to drink and ended up in the "pore-house" (chapters 18, 19). After Robert Johnson has found his long-lost mother, Aunt Linda pours three glasses of her home-made wine so they can celebrate the event. Robert refuses the wine stating, "I'm a temperance man", causing the conversion of Aunt Linda to the temperance idea.

Religion: Prayer plays an important role in the life of the black characters: Iola and Robert discover the first clue of their kinship when Iola sings a special hymn at the bedside of the wounded Robert, which he has learned from his mother (chapter 16). Both find Harriet, their lost grandmother and mother, during a prayer meeting (chapter 20).

When Iola's brother Harry learns that his mother and sister have been reduced to slavery, he asks how such a thing is possible in a "Christian country". The principal of his school gives the answer: "Christian in name" (chapter 14). After the war and the abolition of slavery, in a discussion with her uncle Robert and Dr. Gresham, Iola states that a "fuller comprehension of the claims of the Gospel of Jesus Christ and their application to our national life" is the only "remedy by which our nation can recover from the evil entailed upon her by slavery", to which both Robert and Gresham agree (chapter 25).

In the course of their discussions, the characters also mention Islam. The black pastor, Rev. Carmicle, speaks of the "imperfect creed" of "Mohammedanism". In another discussion, Prof. Gradnor, a black professor from North Carolina, sees Islamic countries as "civilized" and compares them favorably to the southern United States, referring to lynchings and stating, "I know of no civilized country on the globe, Catholic, Protestant, or Mohammedan, where life is less secure than it is in the South".

Women in society: The female characters who exert strong influence on the men in their roles as "moral forces owe something to Stowe and the cult of true womanhood", but they are neither "patterned after the white model" nor are they silent or submissive. On the contrary, "Harper shows the necessity for women's voice". In a conversazione among educated blacks, Iola and Lucille, the only female participants "dominate the discussions. ... Their outspoken, sometimes feminist remarks are readily accepted by the men".

After Iola and her uncle Robert have moved to the North, Iola tells her uncle that she wants to apply for a job as saleswoman. Robert earns enough so that she doesn't have "to go out to work", but she tells him, 

Alleged white superiority: In chapter 17, Iola is teaching black children, when a "gentleman" asks to address the class. He talks about the "achievements of the white race" and then asks "how they did it." 

Positive view of black history: In chapter 30, Lucille Delany says, "Instead of forgetting the past, I would have [our people] hold in everlasting remembrance our great deliverance." Historian David W. Blight quotes this as an example for Harper's work "to forge a positive view of black history", an aim she shared with fellow black writer Pauline Hopkins.

Literary significance and criticism
Iola Leroy "may well have [been] influenced" by Harriet Jacobs's 1861 autobiography Incidents in the Life of a Slave Girl.

The novel was "awarded more blame than praise" by literary critics, but "initial readers responded positively", causing the novel to be reprinted until 1895. From then on, however, it was not re-published until 1971.

Iola Leroy was for some time cited as the first novel written by an African-American woman.  Professor Henry Louis Gates, Jr.'s 1982 discovery of Harriet Wilson's Our Nig (1859) displaced it from that spot. Still, it remains important as "the first black vision of black women's roles in reshaping post-Civil War America" and as a fictional work dealing with complex issues of race, class, and politics in the United States. Recent scholarship suggests that Harper's novel provides a sophisticated understanding of citizenship, gender, and community, particularly the way that African Americans developed hybrid forms of gemeinschaft and gesellschaft before, during, and after slavery.

The African-American journalist Ida B. Wells took up the pen name "Iola" when she first started writing articles about racism in the South.

According to J. F. Yellin, Iola Leroy "helped shape the writings of Zora Neale Hurston and other foremothers of black women writing today."

See also 
 Hinds v. Brazealle, a Mississippi court case that may have inspired the novel

References

Bibliography 
 
 
 Carby, Hazel. Introduction to Iola Leroy, or, Shadows Uplifted by Frances E. W. Harper, Black Women Writers Series, Beacon Press, 1999. .
 
 Cutter, Martha J. "The Politics of Hybridity in Frances Harper's Iola Leroy", Unruly Tongue: Identity and Voice in American Women's Writing 1850 – 1930, University Press of Mississippi, 1999, 141–160.
 
 Ernest, John. "Unsolved Mysteries and Emerging Histories: Frances E. Harper's Iola Leroy", Resistance and Reformation in Nineteenth-century African-American Literature, University Press of Mississippi/Jackson, 1995, 180–207.
 Foreman, P. Gabrielle (Pier Gabrielle). "'Reading Aright': White Slavery, Black Referents, and The Strategy of Histotextuality in Iola Leroy." The Yale Journal of Criticism, vol. 10, no. 2, 1997, p. 327-354. Project MUSE, doi:10.1353/yale.1997.0020.
 Foster, Frances Smith, editor, A Brighter Coming Day: A Frances Ellen Watkins Harper Reader, with introduction by Frances Smith Foster, The Feminist Press at CUNY, 1993.
 Foster, Frances Smith. Introduction to Iola Leroy, or, Shadows Uplifted by Frances E. W. Harper, The Schomburg Library of Nineteenth-Century Black Women Writers, Oxford UP, 1990.
 Gates, Henry Louis, editor, Iola Leroy by Frances Ellen Watkins Harper, Introduction by Hollis Robbins, Penguin, 2010. .
 
 Mitchell, Koritha, editor, Iola Leroy, or, Shadows Uplifted by Frances E. W. Harper, Broadview Press, 2018. 
 
 Williams, Andreá N. "The Language of Class: Taxonomy and Respectability in Frances E. W. Harper's Trial and Triumph and Iola Leroy." In Dividing Lines: Class Anxiety and Postbellum Black Fiction, U of Michigan P, 2013.

External links
 
 
 Terry Novak, Iola Leroy, Literary Encyclopedia
 

1892 American novels
African-American novels
Novels set in Mississippi
Novels set in North Carolina
New England in fiction
Literature by African-American women
1892 debut novels